Two ships of the Royal Australian Navy have been named HMAS Tobruk, after the town of Tobruk in Libya and the siege fought there in 1941.

, a Battle-class destroyer launched in 1947 and in service until 1960, when she was damaged beyond repair during a gunnery exercise
, a modified Round Table-class Landing Ship Heavy launched in 1980 and decommissioned in 2015

Battle honours
Three battle honours have been awarded to ships named HMAS Tobruk:
Korea 1951–53
Malaya 1956
East Timor 1999

See also

References

Royal Australian Navy ship names